The 2002 Race of Champions took place on November 29 to December 1 at Gran Canaria. It was the 15th running of the event, and the 11th at Gran Canaria.

The vehicles used were the Peugeot 206 WRC, the Mitsubishi Lancer Evolution VI Group N, the SEAT Córdoba WRC and the ROC Buggy.

The individual competition was won by Marcus Grönholm, whilst the Nations' Cup was won by USA with Jeff Gordon, Jimmie Johnson and Colin Edwards.

Participants

Junior Rally Masters

Group stage

Final

Nations' Cup

Group stage

Group A

Group B

 France made the semi-finals by having the fastest times of the losing teams.

Group C

Best Times

Knockout stage

Semifinals

Final

Race of Champions

Participation in the main Race of Champions was awarded primarily on the basis of having the best times in the Nations' Cup. There were several exceptions to this rule however - Harri Rovanperä, as the defending champion, was guaranteed a spot, whilst Colin Edwards, despite having the best time among motorcyclists in the Nations' Cup, did not participate. François Duval secured his place by winning the Junior event, Luis Monzón won the Spanish Masters event, and Stig Blomqvist was an invited 'seeded' driver. Jimmie Johnson received a 'wild-card' entry, replacing Nations' Cup teammate Jeff Gordon who was sidelined by food poisoning.

Group stage

Group A

Group B

Knockout stage

Quarterfinals

Semifinals

Final

References

External links
 https://web.archive.org/web/20030623223347/http://www.carreradecampeones.org/

2002
2002 in Spanish motorsport
International sports competitions hosted by Spain
2002,Race of Champions